Klara Forkas Gonçalez Castanho (born 6 October 2000) is a Brazilian actress and singer. She is best known by her roles in telenovelas Viver a Vida and Amor à Vida, as well for her role in Netflix series Back to 15.

Filmography

References 

2000 births
Living people
Brazilian child actresses